Mara Clara is a Philippine drama television series which aired on ABS-CBN's Primetime Bida block from October 25, 2010 to June 3, 2011, replacing 1DOL. Directed by Jerome Chavez Pobocan, the series stars Kathryn Bernardo and Julia Montes together with an ensemble cast. It is a remake of the 1992 series of the same name that starred Judy Ann Santos and Gladys Reyes.  The title is derived from María Clara, the mestiza heroine in Noli Me Tángere, a novel written by José Rizal. It was the highest-rated program of 2011 in Philippine television according to Kantar Media Philippines. The series is streaming online on YouTube.

Series overview

Episodes

2010

2011

References

Mara Clara
2010s television-related lists